HAMC may refer to:
 Harbin Aircraft Manufacturing Corporation, an aircraft manufacturer
 Hells Angels Motorcycle Corporation, or Club, a one-percenter outlaw motorcycle club (MC)
 High and Mighty Color, a Japanese rock band